Reg Beatty (24 December 1913 – 27 May 1957) was an Australian cricketer. He played four first-class matches for New South Wales in 1936/37.

See also
 List of New South Wales representative cricketers

References

External links
 

1913 births
1957 deaths
Australian cricketers
New South Wales cricketers
Cricketers from Newcastle, New South Wales